Fidarestat (SNK-860) is an aldose reductase inhibitor under investigation for treatment of diabetic neuropathy.

References
 Aldose reductase inhibitor for treatment of diabetic complications. Prepn (stereo unspec): M. Kurono, et al., EP 193415; eidem, US 4740517 (1986, 1988 both to Sanwa)
 Prepn of isomers: T. Yamaguchi et al., Arzneim.-Forsch. 44, 344 (1994)
 Pharmacological profile: K. Mizuno et al. in Current Concepts of Aldose Reductase and Its Inhibitions, N. Sakamoto et al., Eds. (Elsevier, Amsterdam, 1990) pp 89–96.
 Configuration and crystal structure of complex with aldose reductase: M. Oka et al., J. Med. Chem. 43, 2479 (2000).
 Clinical efficacy in diabetic peripheral neuropathy: N. Hotta et al., Diabetes Care 24, 1776 (2001).
 Clinical suppression of sorbitol accumulation in erythrocytes of diabetic patients: T. Asano et al., J. Diabetes Complications 16, 133 (2002); eidem, ibid. 18, 336 (2004).
 Review of clinical development: N. Giannoukakis, Curr. Opin. Invest. Drugs 4, 1233-1239 (2003).

Aldose reductase inhibitors
Hydantoins
Orphan drugs